Sainte-Justine-de-Newton is a municipality located in the Montérégie region of Quebec, Canada. The population as of the 2021 Canadian census was 947. The municipality is situated on Route 325 south of Très-Saint-Rédempteur, just east of the Ontario border.

History

In 1805, the geographic township of Newton was created, likely named after Newton Abbot in England.

In 1845, the Township Municipality of Newton was formed, but abolished in 1847. In 1855, it was reestablished as the Parish Municipality of Sainte-Justine-de-Newton, combining the names of the parish and the geographic township. In 1865, its post office opened.

In 2008, the parish municipality changed its statutes to become a (regular) municipality.

Demographics

Language

Local government
List of former mayors:

 Donald Morrisson (1845–1847, 1862–1868)
 John Burke (1855–1860)
 Murdock McCuaig  (1860–1862, 1870)
 Norman McCosham (1868–1870)
 Alfrède Godard (1870–1876, 1881–1885, 1903)
 François Xavier Legault (1876–1877, 1879–1880)
 Honoré Sauvé (1877–1879, 1880–1881, 1886–1887)
 Emmanuel Brunêt (1885–1886)
 Joseph Marcoux (1887–1895)
 Gabriël Legault (1895–1898)
 James Barry (1898–1903, 1906–1908, 1917–1921)
 George Napoléon Temins (1908–1909)
 Léon Sauvé (1910–1911)
 Joseph Guillaume Séguin (1911–1913)
 Narcisse Sabourin (1913–1914)
 Raphael Giroux (1914–1917, 1921–1922)
 Joseph Philippe Ernest Deguire (1922–1933)
 Joseph Oscar Boulais (1933–1939)
 Joseph Donat Ludger Lévac (1939–1942)
 Joseph Aléxandre Henry Lanthier (1942–1947)
 Patrick William Barry (1947–1951)
 Joseph Henri Adélard Bray (1951–1963)
 Joseph-Antoine-Eugène Fex (1963–1973)
 Joseph George Charlebois (1973–1981)
 Joseph Napoléon Raymond Menard (1981–1987)
 Claude Fournier (1987–1992)
 Joseph Maurice Gérard André Lanthier (1992–2005)
 Carol Lazare Dubé (2005–2009)
 Patricia Domingos (2009–2013)
 Gisèle Fournier (2013–2017)
 Denis Ranger (2017–2021)
 Shawn Campbell (2021–present)

Education
Commission Scolaire des Trois-Lacs operates Francophone schools.
 École du Val-des-Prés Sainte-Justine

Lester B. Pearson School Board operates Anglophone schools.
 Soulanges Elementary School in Saint-Télesphore or Evergreen Elementary and Forest Hill Elementary (Junior Campus and Senior campus) in Saint-Lazare

See also
 List of municipalities in Quebec

References

External links
 
 Official website

Municipalities in Quebec
Incorporated places in Vaudreuil-Soulanges Regional County Municipality